This is a timeline of the history of the British broadcaster Meridian Broadcasting (now known as ITV Meridian). It has provided the ITV service for the South and South East of England since 1993.

1990s 
 1991
  16 October – The ITC announces that TVS has lost its licence to Meridian Broadcasting. Meridian had tabled a lower bid but the ITC awarded the licence because it felt that TVS’ bid of £59 million  was too high.
 1992
 No events.
 1993
 1 January – After the chimes of Big Ben, Meridian Broadcasting goes on air. 
 20 July –  Meridian joins up with HTV, Westcountry Television, Channel Television and S4C to form a joint advertising company operated by Meridian Broadcasting and HTV.
 1994
 19 February – Meridian purchases Anglia Television, the ITV franchise for the east of England.
 1995
 No events.
 1996
 MAI merges with United Newspapers (via an agreed takeover by United) to form United News & Media. The resulting company owned the Daily Express newspaper, Meridian Broadcasting, Anglia Television, and a large shareholding (through the Yorkshire Post) in Yorkshire Tyne Tees Television, the owners of Yorkshire Television and Tyne Tees Television.
 1997
 28 June – United News & Media takes over HTV.
 1998
 15 November – The public launch of digital terrestrial TV in the UK takes place.
 1999
 The television assets of Meridian's owner United News & Media are sold to Granada. However, due to regulations stating that the company could not control that large an audience share, the broadcasting arm of HTV is sold to Carlton Television in exchange for Central Independent Television's 20% stake in Meridian Broadcasting.
 8 November – A new, hearts-based on-air look is introduced.

2000s 
 2000
 No events.
 2001
 No events.
 2002
 28 October – On-air regional identities are dropped apart from when introducing regional programmes and Meridian is renamed ITV1 Meridian.
 2003
 No events.
 2004
 January – The final two remaining English ITV companies, Carlton and Granada, merge to create a single England and Wales ITV company called ITV plc.
Meridian moves from Northam studio complex to a new studio base in Whiteley, Hampshire.
2005
 No events.
 2006
 4 December – The non-franchised region ITV Thames Valley is launched. It incorporates the former Central South news service and the Meridian North service and both operate as their own sub-regions for non-news programming and for advertising.
 2007
 No events.
 2008
 December – All non-news local programming ends after Ofcom gives ITV permission to drastically cut back its regional programming. From 2009 the only regional programme is the monthly political discussion show
 2009
16 February – As part of ITV's major cutbacks of its operation in England, Meridian's three news services are amalgamated into one. However part of the programme, and the late night bulletin, remain localised.

2010s
2010
 No events.
2011
 No events.
2012
 27 June – The Meridian region completes digital switchover.
2013
 16 September – The 2009 cut-backs are reversed and once again the Meridian region is served by three opt-out services. However to maintain lower costs, the main half-hour programme at 6pm contains a minimum 20 minutes of regional news (10 minutes in the Thames Valley) and daily use of "shared content" from outside the region.

See also 
 History of ITV
 History of ITV television idents
 Timeline of ITV
 Timeline of TVS – Meridian's predecessor

References

Television in the United Kingdom by year
ITV timelines